Barnacahoge Cashel, is a stone ringfort (cashel) and National Monument located in County Mayo, Ireland.

Location

Barnacahoge Cashel is located on a hill immediately west of Ireland West Airport Knock.

History

Barnacahoge Cashel was constructed in early Christian period (7th or 8th century AD) and may have been inhabited as late as the 18th century. Within the shelter of these stone walls were thatched dwellings of mud and wattle, and pens into which livestock could have been herded when threatened by enemies.

It was rediscovered in 1976–77.

Description

References

National Monuments in County Mayo
Archaeological sites in County Mayo